Do Khvaharan (also Romanized as Do Khvāharān; also known as Do Khāharān) is a village in Silakhor Rural District, Silakhor District, Dorud County, Lorestan Province, Iran. At the 2006 census, its population was 30, in 7 families.

References 

Towns and villages in Dorud County